M. mola may refer to:
 Mola mola, a fish species
 Mylochromis mola, a fish species

See also
Mola (disambiguation)